Paradiplospinus is a genus of snake mackerels native to the southern oceans.

Species
There are currently two recognized species in this genus:
 Paradiplospinus antarcticus Andriashev, 1960 (Antarctic escolar)
 Paradiplospinus gracilis (A. B. Brauer, 1906) (Slender escolar)

References

Gempylidae
Taxa named by Anatoly Andriyashev